Phyllobrostis daphneella is a moth in the  family Lyonetiidae. It is found in Morocco, Algeria, Tunisia, Portugal, Spain, France, Corsica, mainland Italy and Sardinia.

The wingspan is 8.8-9.5 mm for males and 9.5–10 mm for females. Adults are on wing from April to May and again in August in two generations in France.

The larvae feed on Daphne gnidium. They mine the leaves of their host plant. The mine consists of a full depth corridor. The frass is glued to the upper epidermis, giving the mine a blackish appearance. Part of the frass is ejected through a slit in the lower epidermis. Pupation takes place outside of the mine in a silken cocoon spun between leaves or in leaf folds.

External links
Revision of the genus Phyllobrostis Staudinger, 1859 (Lepidoptera, Lyonetiidae)
bladmineerders.nl

Lyonetiidae
Moths of Europe
Moths described in 1859